The Williams Lake Mustangs was a Junior ice hockey team from Williams Lake, British Columbia, Canada. They were members of the Rocky Mountain Junior Hockey League.

History
The Williams Lake Mustangs were founded in 1978 as members of the Peace-Cariboo Junior B League. In 1980, with the Peace-Cariboo League, the Mustangs were promoted to Junior A.

As members of the Peace-Cariboo League, the Mustangs won the PCJHL Trophy twice as playoff champions. They participated in the 1983 and 1989 Mowat Cup BC Jr. A championships as representatives of the PCJHL. In 1983, the British Columbia Junior Hockey League's Abbotsford Flyers defeated the Mustangs two-games-to-none. In 1989, the BCJHL's Vernon Lakers defeated the Mustangs two-games-to-none.

In 1991, the PCJHL merged with franchises from the Kootenays Region and became the Rocky Mountain League. The Mustangs won the RMJHL league title in 1993 and represented the league for the Mowat Cup. In 1993, the BCHL's Kelowna Spartans defeated the Mustangs three-games-to-none.

In 1996, the RMJHL's Peace-Cariboo division folded, forcing the Mustangs to take a year off. As a result, the Mustangs lost their renewal application for a bingo hall, the main source of revenue for the club. As a result, the club liquidated what they could of their debt. In March 1997, the club announced they would sit out a second consecutive season after failing to find new ownership. Later they lost their arena advertising rights and ceased operations. Junior hockey returned in the early 2000s when the Williams Lake TimberWolves joined the British Columbia Hockey League.

Season-by-season standings

Playoffs
1981 DNQ
1982 DNQ
1983 Won league, lost Mowat Cup
Williams Lake Mustangs defeated Dawson Creek Kodiaks 3-games-to-1
Williams Lake Mustangs defeated Quesnel Millionaires 3-games-to-none
Williams Lake Mustangs defeated Dawson Creek Kodiaks 4-games-to-1 PCJHL champions
Abbotsford Flyers (BCJHL) defeated Williams Lake Mustangs 2-games-to-none
1984 Lost final
Williams Lake Mustangs defeated Grande Prairie North Stars 4-games-to-none
Prince George Spruce Kings defeated Williams Lake Mustangs 4-games-to-1
1985 Lost Semi-final
Prince George Spruce Kings defeated Williams Lake Mustangs 4-games-to-none
1986 Lost Final
Williams Lake Mustangs defeated Fort St. John Huskies 4-games-to-2
Prince George Spruce Kings defeated Williams Lake Mustangs 4-games-to-1
1987 DNQ
1988 Lost semi-final
Grande Prairie North Stars defeated Williams Lake Mustangs 4-games-to-1
1989 Won league, lost Mowat Cup
Williams Lake Mustangs defeated Fort St. John Huskies 4-games-to-1 
Williams Lake Mustangs defeated Grande Prairie North Stars 4-games-to-1 PCJHL champions
Vernon Lakers (BCJHL) defeated Williams Lake Mustangs 2-games-to-none
1990 Lost semi-final
Prince George Spruce Kings defeated Williams Lake Mustangs 4-games-to-1
1991 Lost final
Williams Lake Mustangs defeated Fort St. John Huskies 4-games-to-none
Prince George Spruce Kings defeated Williams Lake Mustangs 4-games-to-1
1992 Lost quarter-final
Fort St. John Huskies defeated Williams Lake Mustangs 4-games-to-1
1993 Won League, lost Mowat Cup
Williams Lake Mustangs defeated Quesnel Millionaires 4-games-to-none
Williams Lake Mustangs defeated Prince George Spruce Kings 4-games-to-none
Williams Lake Mustangs defeated Cranbrook Colts 3-games-to-2 RMJHL champions
Kelowna Spartans (BCHL) defeated Williams Lake Mustangs 3-games-to-none
1994 Lost quarter-final
Prince George Spruce Kings defeated Williams Lake Mustangs 4-games-to-none
1995 Lost semi-final
Williams Lake Mustangs defeated Grande Prairie Chiefs 4-games-to-2
Prince George Spruce Kings defeated Williams Lake Mustangs 4-games-to-none
1996 DNQ

NHL alumni
Craig Berube
Wade Flaherty
Mark Kachowski
Dean Malkoc

References

External links
BC Hockey

Ice hockey teams in British Columbia
1978 establishments in British Columbia
Ice hockey clubs established in 1978
1996 disestablishments in British Columbia
Ice hockey clubs disestablished in 1996